The 1963 United Nations Security Council election was held on 18 October, 30 October, and 1 November during the eighteenth session of the United Nations General Assembly, held at United Nations Headquarters in New York City. The General Assembly elected four members through consultation of the president, as non-permanent members of the UN Security Council for two-year mandates commencing on 1 January 1964.

Rules 
The Security Council had eleven seats, filled by five permanent members and six non-permanent members. Each year, half of the non-permanent members are elected for two-year terms. A sitting member may not immediately run for re-election. Candidates must reach a required two-thirds majority to be elected to the United Nations Security Council.

Result 
At this time, the United Nations had 113 member states (for a timeline of UN membership, see Enlargement of the United Nations). There were three open seats, as the Philippines, Ghana, and Venezuela were retiring. Mr. Dashtseren (Mongolia) and Mr. Lynch-Shyllon (Sierra Leone) served as tellers. The first ballot was unrestricted, with seven candidacies for three seats. The Ivory Coast and Bolivia were elected to permanent seats and Czechoslovakia and Malaysia moved on to a restricted second round of voting. After three unclear ballots, the council reverted to an unrestricted ballot. As no nation received a majority, the elections were suspended for another day. The General Assembly reconvened on 25 October 1963, and held five further ballots, and again on November 1, when a third member was elected.

See also 

 List of members of the United Nations Security Council

References

Sources

External links 

 UN Document A/59/881 Note Verbale from the Permanent Mission of Costa Rica containing a record of Security Council elections up to 2004

1963 elections
1963
Non-partisan elections
1963 in international relations
Security Council election